Chris Casher (born December 30, 1993) is a professional Canadian football defensive lineman who is currently a free agent. He most recently played for the Edmonton Elks of the Canadian Football League (CFL).

College career
Casher played college football with the Florida State from 2012 to 2015 where he was a member of the 2014 BCS National Championship team. He left Florida State after 2015 and played his senior season with the Faulkner Eagles in 2016.

Professional career

Oakland Raiders
After going undrafted in the 2017 NFL Draft, Casher signed with the Oakland Raiders on May 8, 2017. He was released by the Raiders on August 4, 2017.

New York Giants
On August 14, 2017, Casher signed with the New York Giants. He played in three preseason games and was part of the teams final releases on September 1, 2017.

Winnipeg Blue Bombers
Casher signed a practice roster agreement with the Winnipeg Blue Bombers on October 24, 2017 for the last few games of the season and signed a futures contract with the team for 2018. He attended training camp with the Blue Bombers in 2018, but was part of the final cuts on June 9, 2018.

Calgary Stampeders
On September 11, 2018, Casher signed a practice roster agreement with the Calgary Stampeders. He spent the rest of the season on the practice roster until the last game of the regular season where he was placed on the injured roster. He was on the practice roster when the Stampeders won the 106th Grey Cup. He then re-signed with the Stampeders to a one-year contract on December 10, 2018. 

Casher had a breakout year in 2019 as he played in 16 regular season games where he recorded 34 defensive tackles, seven sacks, and one forced fumble. He played in his first career regular season game on June 29, 2019 against the BC Lions and had his first two sacks in the next game on July 6, 2019 against the Saskatchewan Roughriders. He also played in the team's West Semi-Final loss to the Winnipeg Blue Bombers.

BC Lions
On February 11, 2020, Casher signed a one-year contract with the BC Lions. However, he did not play in 2020 due to the cancellation of the 2020 CFL season, so he re-signed with the Lions on February 2, 2021. However, he was cut at the end of training camp and was released on July 27, 2021.

Edmonton Elks
On September 28, 2021, Casher was signed by the Edmonton Elks and was moved from the suspended list to the practice roster on October 11, 2021. He played in two games for the Elks in 2021 and was released on December 28, 2021.

References

External links
Edmonton Elks bio

1993 births
Living people
BC Lions players
American football defensive linemen
American players of Canadian football
Calgary Stampeders players
Canadian football defensive linemen
Edmonton Elks players
Florida State Seminoles football players
Oakland Raiders players
New York Giants players
Players of American football from Alabama
Sportspeople from Mobile, Alabama
Winnipeg Blue Bombers players